Paralicornia is a genus of gymnolaematan bryozoans (sea mats).

Species 
 Paralicornia hamata (Tilbrook & Vieira, 2012)
 Paralicornia limatula (Hayward, 1988)
 Paralicornia obtecta (Haswell, 1880)
 Paralicornia pusilla (Smitt, 1872)
 Paralicornia sinuosa (Canu & Bassler, 1927)
 Paralicornia spatulatoidea (Liu, 1980)
 Paralicornia unguiculata (Osburn, 1950)
 Paralicornia spatulata (d'Orbigny, 1851) (taxon inquirendum)

References

Further reading
Badve, R. M., and M. A. Sonar. "Some fossil neocheilostomine bryozoans from the Holocene of the west coast of Maharashtra and Goa, India." Jour. Palaeontol. Soc. India 42 (1997): 35-48.
GORDON, Dennis. "Bryozoa of New Caledonia." Compendium of marine species of New Caledonia. Documents scientifiques et techniques (2006): 157-168.
Vieira, Leandro M., et al. "Evidence for polyphyly of the genus Scrupocellaria (Bryozoa: Candidae) based on a phylogenetic analysis of morphological characters." PLoS ONE 9.4 (2014): e95296.
Vieira, Leandro M., et al. "Evidence for polyphyly of the genus Scrupocellaria (Bryozoa: Candidae) based on a phylogenetic analysis of morphological characters." PLoS ONE 9.4 (2014): e95296.

Cheilostomatida
Animals described in 2014